Kurkowo  is a village in the administrative district of Gmina Grabowo, within Kolno County, Podlaskie Voivodeship, in north-eastern Poland.

The village has a population of 170.

References

Kurkowo